Bacamarte is a Brazilian symphonic/progressive rock band originally formed in 1974 by three school friends, although, because of their ages, they soon disbanded. In 1977 Neto reformed Bacamarte with a new set of musicians and it was this line-up that in 1978 recorded Bacamarte's opus Depois do Fim. Neto was wary of the then popular disco scene and decided that he would withhold the tape and release it at a more suitable time. After being persuaded by a friend in 1982 he submitted the tape to a local radio station; the album itself was then released in early 1983. A second album was released in 1999 from material recorded in the 1980s; this album, Sete Cidades (Seven Cities) is largely considered a Mario Neto solo work and features only Neto and keyboardist Robério Molinari.
However, the original line up decided to join again for a series of shows, and are working together from time to time using the moniker Bacamarte.

Lineup
Vinícius de Oliveira – bass
Nelson Paiva – drums
Hugo Lacerda – vocals
Jane Duboc – vocals.
Márcus Moura – flute, accordion.
Mario Neto – electric and acoustic guitars, piano, keyboards, bass, drums, percussion, vocals.
Mr. Paul – percussion.
Delto Simas – bass.
Marco Verissimo – drums.
Sergio Villarim – keyboards.

Discography
Depois Do Fim (1983)
Sete Cidades (1999)

All-Time Ranking
Depois Do Fim is ranked number 40 on the Prog Archives Top Studio Albums of All-Time.

References

Brazilian progressive rock groups
Musical groups established in 1974
Musical groups disestablished in 1984
Musical groups reestablished in 2012
1974 establishments in Brazil
1984 disestablishments in Brazil